Marmaton Valley High School is a public high school located in Moran, Kansas, United States, serving students in grades 7–12. The current principal is Kim Ensminger. The school colors are orange and black.

Academics
Marmaton Valley serves 193 students in grades 7–12. The school received a 9 out of 10 rating according to Greatschools.net.

Extracurricular activities
Marmaton Valley is a member of the Kansas State High School Activities Association and offers a variety of sports programs. Athletic teams compete in the 1A division and are known as the "Wildcats". Extracurricular activities are also offered in the form of performing arts, school publications, and clubs.

Athletics
The extracurricular activities offered at Marmaton Valley High School are few and numbered due to the school's small size. The Wildcats compete various sports programs and are classified as a 1A school, the smallest classification in Kansas according to the Kansas State High School Activities Association. Throughout its history, Marmaton Valley has never won a team state championship in any sport, although it has had individual state champions.

See also
 List of high schools in Kansas
 List of unified school districts in Kansas

References

External links
 School District
 Moran City Map, KDOT
 Allen County Map, KDOT

Public high schools in Kansas
Schools in Allen County, Kansas
Public middle schools in Kansas